Nervia nerva, the scarce ranger or scarce skipper, is a species of butterfly of the family Hesperiidae. It is found in South Africa (KwaZulu-Natal, Transvaal), Zimbabwe, Angola and north-western Zambia.

The wingspan is 27–31 mm for males and 33–36 mm for females. Adults are on wing from October to November and from February to April. There are two generations per year.

Subspecies
Nervia nerva nerva - South Africa (Limpopo Province, Mpumalanga, North West Province, Gauteng, Free State Province, KwaZulu-Natal)
Nervia nerva paola (Plötz, 1884) - Kenya, Tanzania, Angola, Zimbabwe, north-western Zambia

References

Butterflies described in 1793